Giuseppe Labonia, O.A.D. (6 November 1638 – 30 March 1720) was a Roman Catholic prelate who served as Bishop of Montemarano (1670–1720).

Biography
Giuseppe Labonia was born in Rossano, Italy on 6 November 1638 and ordained a priest in the Ordo Augustiniensium Discalceatorum on 24 September 1661.
On 17 November 1670, he was appointed during the papacy of Pope Clement X as Bishop of Montemarano.
On 23 November 1670, he was consecrated bishop by Marcello Santacroce, Bishop of Tivoli, with Alessandro Crescenzi (cardinal), Bishop Emeritus of Bitonto, and Ulisse Orsini, Bishop of Ripatransone, serving as co-consecrators. 
He served as Bishop of Montemarano until his death on 30 March 1720.

References

External links and additional sources
 (for Chronology of Bishops) 
 (for Chronology of Bishops)  

17th-century Italian Roman Catholic bishops
18th-century Italian Roman Catholic bishops
Bishops appointed by Pope Clement X
1638 births
1720 deaths
People from the Province of Cosenza
Discalced Augustinian bishops